Erik Ruiz (born March 10, 1992) is an American professional boxer trained by former world champion Robert Garcia.

Personal life 
Erik Ruiz is the uncle of undefeated prospect Andrew Ruiz.

Professional career 
On June 3, 2011, Ruiz beat Shaun Solomon by TKO to win his professional debut.

See also 
Notable boxing families

References

External links 

American boxers of Mexican descent
Boxers from California
Super-bantamweight boxers
1992 births
Living people
American male boxers
People from Oxnard, California